Armand Gutheim is a Swedish composer. Until 2011, he was director of the Dansfestival Västmanland, a dance festival in Västmanland, Sweden.

References

Swedish composers
Swedish male composers
Year of birth missing (living people)
Living people